Levan Ghvaberidze (born January 1, 1982) is a Georgian rugby union player.

He arrived to France from Georgia as an under-21 international player and joined the Fédérale 3 club SO Voiron in 2001. After two impressive seasons, he was signed by elite neighbouring club FC Grenoble. During his first season there, he received his first cap for Georgia on February 14, 2004 against Portugal and scored a try in the 14–19 loss. It is so far his only cap.

References

1982 births
Living people
Rugby union players from Georgia (country)
Rugby union hookers
Rugby union players from Tbilisi
Expatriate rugby union players from Georgia (country)
Expatriate rugby union players in France
Expatriate sportspeople from Georgia (country) in France
Georgia international rugby union players